The year 2001 is the 1st year in the history of the Maximum Fighting Championship, a mixed martial arts promotion based in Canada. In 2001 Maximum Fighting Championship held 2 events beginning with, MFC 1: Maximum Fighting.

Events list

MFC 1: Maximum Fighting

MFC 1: Maximum Fighting was an event held on March 3, 2001 in Grande Prairie, Alberta, Canada.

Results

MFC 2: Rumble at the Jungle

MFC 2: Rumble at the Jungle was an event held on November 24, 2001 at the West Edmonton Mall in Edmonton, Alberta, Canada.

Results

See also 
 Maximum Fighting Championship
 List of Maximum Fighting Championship events

References

Maximum Fighting Championship events
2001 in mixed martial arts
Events in Edmonton
Events in Alberta